Bo Honoré is a Danish economist who is currently the Class of 1913 Professor of Political Economy at Princeton University.

References

Year of birth missing (living people)
Living people
Princeton University faculty
American economists
University of Chicago alumni
Fellows of the Econometric Society